Oplismenus undulatifolius, commonly known as wavyleaf basketgrass, is a species of perennial grass from the family Poaceae that is native to Eurasia, specifically Southern Europe through Southern Asia. Due to its invasive nature, it can be found in countries such as Pakistan (Punjab & Kashmir), China, Japan, Korea, India, Australia, South Africa, and has since been introduced to the Mid-Atlantic United States. There are no recognized subspecies in Catalogue of Life.

Description

Oplismenus undulatifolius is a shallow rooted perennial with stolons that may grow to several feet in length. The leaves of overwintering plants become brown and dead, but in the spring, new growth begins at the upper nodes of the stolons. In early fall, the sticky awns readily adhere to anything that brushes against them which makes for an effective mode of dispersal.

Flowers and fruits grow from July to November.

This species grows particularly well in moist, shaded environments, in a variety of soil types. In Australia it grows in shady coastal forests at Coffs Harbour.

Ecology
In its native range, Oplismenus undulatifolius is a food source for many species of Lepidoptera, including Elachista kurokoi, Helcystogramma fuscomarginatum, Mycalesis francisca, Mycalesis sangaica, Mycalesis zonata,  Palaeonympha opalina, Stigmella oplismeniella, Ypthima akragas, Ypthima baldus, and Ypthima esakii.

As an invasive species 
Accidentally introduced into the United States in Maryland and Virginia, this species spreads quickly and is becoming extremely invasive in forested natural areas in the Mid-Atlantic region across numerous counties in Maryland and Virginia.

The species was first reported in Maryland in 1996, growing around the Liberty Reservoir area and the northern section of the Patapsco River in Howard County. The grass spread quickly into connected natural areas in Baltimore and Carroll counties. By 1999 it was identified in Montgomery County at Wheaton Regional Park. In 2006 it was identified in Prince George's County at Little Paint Branch Park , the adjacent Beltsville Agricultural Research Center-East and the National Greenbelt Park. It had crossed into Virginia by 2004 where it was found growing at an  site in Shenandoah National Park, and in a  site at the Fraser Preserve along the Potomac River in Fairfax County.

Once a population has become established, complete eradication from a site has proven to be extremely difficult due to a long-lived perennial life cycle, a long seed germination season (April–November), and considerable seed mobility of the species.

Gallery

References

External links

Oplismenus undulatifolius on YouTube
 Invasive Species of Concern in Maryland. Invader of the month (August 6, 2007); Wavyleaf basketgrass, (Oplismenus hirtellus ssp. undulatifolius).
 Wavyleaf Basketgrass, Wildlife and Heritage Service, Maryland Department of Natural Resources. 
 Wavy-leaf Basket grass Eradication at BARC. 
 Virginia Forests: Wavyleaf Basket Grass, an Invasive Exotic, Found in Virginia. 
 Maryland Chapter of Sierra Club: Wave Goodbye to Wavy Leaf Basketgrass. 
 Chesapeake Bay Journal: Wave bye-bye to wavyleaf basketgrass by Karl Blankenship. 
 Maryland has become ground zero for a new invasive species threat, wavyleaf basketgrass, by Jill Rosen. 
 Flora of the Carolinas, Virginia, Georgia, and surrounding areas by Alan S. Weakley (Page 897). 
 Oplismenus undulatifolius in the Guide to Invasive and Hegemonic Grasses

undulatifolius
Flora of Asia
Flora of China
Flora of Japan
Flora of Korea